Dover School District may refer to:
Dover School District (Arkansas) in Dover, Arkansas 
Dover School District (New Hampshire) in Dover, New Hampshire 
Dover School District (New Jersey) in Dover, New Jersey 
Dover School District (Oklahoma) in Dover, Oklahoma 
Dover School District (Wisconsin) in Kansasville, Wisconsin 
Dover Area School District in Dover Township, Pennsylvania
Dover Union Free School District in Dover Plains, New York 

See also
Kitzmiller v. Dover Area School District, a 2005 court case